Sivakumar (born 1941) is an Indian Tamil actor.

Sivakumar is a name predominantly used by Dravidian people. Literally, it consists of two names, Siva, literally meaning auspicious one or it may refer to a main god of Hinduism. Kumar means warrior or it may refer to the Hindu god of war. It may also refer to son of Shiva. Therefore, Kumar can mean "son" as it can refer to Lord Ganesh or Lord Muruga.

People with this name include:
 Narayanan Shivakumar, entrepreneur that worked for Google
 Sivakumar Varatharaju Naidu (born 1970), Malaysian politician
 Sivakumar Vijayan (born 1982), Indian cinematographer
 Mini Sivakumar (1961–2010), Indian visual artist